Mimeremon flavovittatum is a species of beetle in the family Cerambycidae, and the only species in the genus Mimeremon. It was described by Breuning in 1967.

References

Desmiphorini
Beetles described in 1967
Monotypic beetle genera